Chrysocercops lithocarpiella is a moth of the family Gracillariidae. It is known from Pahang, Malaysia.

The wingspan is 4.4–5.4 mm.

The larvae feed on Lithocarpus rassa. They mine the leaves of their host plant. The mine has the form of an interparenchymal blotch.

References

Chrysocercops
Moths described in 1992